Giles Robin Patrick Coren (born 29 July 1969) is a British columnist, food writer, and television and radio presenter. He has been a restaurant critic for The Times newspaper since 2002, and was named Food and Drink Writer of the Year at the British Press Awards in 2005.

Coren has been involved in a number of controversies, including breaching a privacy injunction and expressing pleasure at the death of another writer.

Early life
Coren was born in Paddington, London, the only son of Anne (née Kasriel) and English journalist and humourist Alan Coren. His father had been brought up in an Orthodox Jewish household, but his own upbringing was less Orthodox. He is the elder brother of journalist Victoria Coren Mitchell, and also related to the Canadian journalist Michael Coren.

Education
Coren was educated at The Hall School, an independent boys' junior school in Hampstead, London, and at Westminster School, an independent boys' senior school in Central London, followed by Keble College at the University of Oxford, where he was awarded a first-class degree in English.

Writing

Journalism
Coren has been a restaurant critic for The Times since 2002, having previously been restaurant critic for Tatler magazine and The Independent on Sunday. He was named "Food And Drink Writer of the Year" at the 2005 British Press Awards and in 2016 was named Restaurant Writer of the Year at the Fortnum and Mason Awards. As well as his restaurant work, he also contributes a regular column to The Times, the subjects of which range from personal life to politics. Under the pseudonym Professor Gideon Garter he wrote The Intellectual's Guide to Fashion for The Sunday Times.

According to a paper published in Journalism Practice by Dr. Peter English and Dr. David Fleischman, Coren is "a sharp, witty columnist who can write with tongue in cheek". According to an English study, the average grade in Coren's reviews in The Times was 6.86. Coren claims his average score is actually 6.3, but should be 5; however, he produces "no more than half a dozen really bad" reviews a year.

Coren has contributed articles to publications including Tatler and GQ. In November 2014, he joined Time Out as a columnist, writing weekly on city life.

Books
Coren is credited by inventor James Dyson as the co-author of his autobiography published in 1997.

In 2005, he published his first novel, Winkler, reviewed in the New Statesman and The Independent. One section of the novel won the Literary Review'''s "Bad Sex in Fiction Award".ShortList magazine named it 'one of the absolute worst 'Bad Sex Awards' entries ever.'

The book garnered a £30,000 advance yet only sold 771 copies in hardback and 1400 in paperback. 

Coren has also written two non-fiction books: the first, Anger Management (For Beginners), a compilation of columns he had written for The Times, which was published in 2010; and his second, How To Eat Out, which was published in 2012.

Coren is the editor of the dining guide Truth, Love & Clean Cutlery: A Guide to the Truly Good Restaurants and Food Experiences of the UK.

Television
In 2005, Coren appeared as a regular correspondent on Gordon Ramsay's The F Word. In June 2006, he presented a programme on More4, entitled Tax the Fat, about clinical obesity and the cost it presents to the NHS. He co-presented the Channel 4 series Animal Farm with Dr Olivia Judson in March 2007. Around the same time, he appeared in a series of television commercials advertising Birds Eye frozen foods. Also in 2006, Coren presented the film and DVD review programme Movie Lounge.

With comedian Sue Perkins, Coren co-starred in a series of documentaries known as The Supersizers.... In the first, Edwardian Supersize Me (BBC Four, 2007), the two spent a week on the diet of a wealthy Edwardian (i.e. pre-WWI) couple. The second series (The Supersizers Go...) broadcast in May 2008 on BBC Two. The 2009 series, The Supersizers Eat..., covered the cuisine of the 1980s, the 1950s, 1920s, the French Revolution, Medieval culture, and ancient Rome.

In 2012, Coren presented Our Food on the BBC, travelling the country talking about various local foods. In 2013, he presented Passover - Why is this night different? for BBC1 and co-presented (alongside Alexander Armstrong) 12 Drinks of Christmas for the same channel. In 2014, Coren ventured to North America. Firstly, he filmed Pressure Cooker,  a cooking competition show co-hosted by Anne-Marie Withenshaw and Chuck Hughes, produced by Jamie Oliver’s Fresh One Productions and Bristow Global Media, and broadcast on Canada's W Network and the US FYI Network. Coren followed that up with Million Dollar Critic for BBC America, which premiered on 22 January 2015 directly after Gordon Ramsay's New Kitchen Nightmares.

In 2015, Coren began a new BBC series, co-presented with social historian Polly Russell. Back in Time for Dinner, six-hour-long programmes broadcast from March 2015 Back in Time for Dinner achieved a BAFTA nomination in the 'Features' category. Back in Time for Christmas (Christmas food) and Back in Time for the Weekend (leisure activities) followed. In 2016, Coren filmed Back in Time for Brixton and Further Back in Time for Dinner and the two were released in 2016 and 2017 respectively.Eat to Live Forever was shown in March 2015.

In 2016, Coren fronted the one-off documentary My Failed Novel for Sky Arts. For the same channel, he co-hosted eight-part series Fake! The Great Masterpiece Challenge alongside art historian Rose Balston. In 2016, he presented 500 Questions, a four-part primetime game show on ITV. The series is taken from the US where it aired on ABC. Created by Mark Burnett, it was described as "an intense battle of brainpower that will test even the smartest of contestants".

In 2017, he presented Amazing Hotels: Life Beyond the Lobby alongside Monica Galetti. A second series aired in 2018, a third in 2020 and a fourth in 2021-22. Coren's departure from Amazing Hotels was announced in 2022.

Radio
Between September 2019 and July 2020, Coren presented a weekly programme on Talkradio, on Sundays from 7pm to 10pm. Between July 2020 and December 2021, he presented a weekly programme on Times Radio, on Friday afternoons.

Controversies

Leaked e-mail to subeditors
 
On 23 July 2008, The Guardian media blog published an email from Coren to sub-editors at The Times. Coren's internal Times email used profanity, the use of which he defends, to take issue with a colleague's removal of an indefinite article (an "a") from his piece, which he believed ruined a joke in his last line. Coren said a joke was lost in the change from "a nosh" (meaning fellatio) to "nosh"—a word derived from Yiddish meaning "food", which he doubted his editors knew better than he. The Daily Telegraph said the incident was "not the first time the critic has been caught out writing abusive emails to colleagues". The exchange was reprinted in the American magazine Harper's in October 2008.

Polish controversy

In his next article, dated 26 July 2008, Coren said his Jewish ancestors had been persecuted by Poles. He stated that Poles used to burn Jews in synagogues for entertainment at Easter; and that Poland is in denial about its role in the Holocaust. He referred to immigrant Poles as "Polacks", arguing that "if England is not the land of milk and honey it appeared to them three or four years ago, then, frankly, they can clear off out of it".

Coren's comments led to a complaint to the Press Complaints Commission, an early day motion in the Parliament of the United Kingdom, and a critical editorial in The Economist. Coren responded: "I wrote in passing that the Poles remain in denial about their responsibility for the Holocaust. How gratifying, then, to see so many letters in The Times in the subsequent days from Poles denying their responsibility for the Holocaust." He also told The Jewish Chronicle: "Fuck the Poles". After the Press Complaints Commission rejected their complaint because the criticism had been of a group rather than an individual, the Federation of Poles in Great Britain (FPGB) lodged a complaint with the European Court of Human Rights.

Professor Gábor Halmai of the EU Fundamental Rights Agency said "I completely share the criticisms" of the piece made by The Economist. He said that amid an internal debate about an FRA response, a Cypriot colleague who had a tendency to relativize, had said "it is not even certain that what Coren stated with regard to his past had taken place at all". Halmai responded that while the generalisation used by Coren was unacceptable, it was protected under freedom of expression, conceding the existence of the Jedwabne, Krakow and  Kielce pogroms. 

Mediawatch complaint over Twitter posting
On 14 January 2010, Coren attracted criticism after he posted on his Twitter feed: "Next door have bought their 12-year-old son a drum kit. For fuck's sake! Do I kill him then burn it? Or do I fuck him, then kill him then burn it?" Vivienne Pattison, director of watchdog Mediawatch UK, condemned the remark as "very bad taste". Coren later posted: "Oh hell's bells. Look, can I just say I didn't kill the kid, or have sex with him. And anyway he's not real. And I live in Vienna."

Privacy injunction and alleged contempt of court

On 13 May 2011, Coren attracted controversy after joking about a privacy injunction by posting on his Twitter account: "god, ANOTHER injunction tonight. another footballer. and SUCH a boring one. fucking shit midfielder... he's yet another very ugly married man who's been carrying on with a gold-digging flopsie he should have seen coming a MILE away". Then on 14 May he tweeted "Gareth Barry looks remarkably relaxed when you consider that... first touch for Gareth Barry... not according to what I've heard... time for a bet. what chance Barry to score? tiny fiver on barry to score at 22–1. wdv been nice to get a double with Giggs in the match before... Barry's been pulled off...". This was later deleted but was archived.

On 22 May 2011, it was reported that lawyers at Schillings acting for an England footballer had persuaded the High Court judge Mr. Justice Tugendhat to ask the Attorney General for England and Wales, Dominic Grieve, to consider the criminal prosecution of "a top journalist" over a matter that breached a privacy injunction. Coren acknowledged on Twitter that he could face jail for contempt of court, saying: "A funny fucking day. The support of twitter has been almost tear-jerking. But I am afraid there won't be room for all of us in the cell. xxx." On 23 May 2011, Liberal Democrat Member of Parliament John Hemming spoke in the House of Commons and used parliamentary privilege to identify Coren as the person involved, leading to an immediate rebuke from Speaker of the House of Commons John Bercow.Sky News Giggs Named In Commons As Footballer Identified On Twitter In Context Of Injunctions YouTube, 23 May 2011 In an interview with The Sunday Times on 29 May 2011, Hemming stated that he considered naming both footballers in the Coren controversy, before the Speaker stopped him. Hemming commented that the Speaker was "probably right to do so", and added: "I couldn't be guaranteed his family didn't know, whereas Giggs' name had been chanted on the terraces."

According to The Daily Telegraph, the Premier League footballer identified by Coren in the tweets was not Ryan Giggs, and was known in the privacy injunction by the pseudonym TSE. The case at the High Court of Justice was TSE & ELP v News Group Newspapers Ltd, with TSE being described as "a married footballer" who had been involved in an extra-marital relationship with a woman known as ELP. Neither person had wished The Sun to publish the details of the relationship. The injunction was granted on 13 May 2011 by Mr. Justice Tugendhat, who accepted claims from the footballer that publication of the details of the relationship "would provoke the cruel chants of supporters." Tugendhat said that aspects of the case had been published on "various electronic media, including Twitter", but added: "the fact that these publications have occurred does not mean that there should be no injunction in this case".

Fake Polish Twitter account

In December 2018, it was discovered that Giles Coren had an alternative Twitter account that "he once used to suggest people critical of him were motivated by antisemitism". The account stated to be of a Polish plumber with a bio composed in broken English and Coren's book cover as avatar.

Tweets after the death of Dawn Foster

In July 2021, following the death of the journalist Dawn Foster, Coren tweeted the following:

An earlier version of this tweet included the words, "you can fuck off on to hell now where you belong" in place of, "HA HA HA HA HA HA". 

Both tweets were quickly deleted but were screen-grabbed and widely shared online. It is alleged Coren was upset because Foster had previously implied he had secured his job writing for The Times through his father. Coren's comments stirred considerable controversy, with several figures in the media criticising him, and some calling for him to lose his jobs with The Times and Times Radio. The press regulator  IPSO received several complaints but took no action and Coren's home in North London was daubed in graffiti paying tribute to Foster. It read: "Dawn Foster Forever". Dog excrement was reportedly left at his property.

 Popeyes review controversy 
In January 2022, The Times magazine published Coren's review of a new Popeyes branch in Stratford, East London. Coren wrote that "exploiters" of fried chicken recipes in chain restaurants had brought "obesity, sloth, waste, [and] high street degradation" to white communities. In the article Coren wrote: Isn't fried chicken, in a weird way, a form of race revenge? The thrusting young economies of West Africa now must surely look at a KFC bargain bucket and high-five themselves that their ancestors had the forethought, all those years ago, to provide the means by which white culture would one day poison itself to death.The Independent's Race Correspondent, Nadine White, tweeted: "A review of the new London Popeyes restaurant in The Times. Fried chicken = Black people = sloth, waste, degradation."

 Personal life 
Coren met his wife Esther Walker, a journalist, author and food blogger, around 2007. They have two children and live in Kentish Town.

He drives a Jaguar I-Pace, which has been stolen more than once.

Bibliography
Coren, Giles Winkler; London: Jonathan Cape Ltd, 2005
Coren, Giles Anger Management for Beginners: A Self-Help Course in 70 Lessons; London: Hodder & Stoughton, 2010
Coren, Giles How to Eat Out: Lessons from a Life Lived Mostly in Restaurants''; London: Hodder & Stoughton, 2012

References

External links 
Giles Coren articles Times Online 
Giles Coren reviews Times Online 
Five Minutes With: Giles Coren Interview with BBC News, 20 December 2012.

1969 births
Living people
People from Paddington
English people of Jewish descent
People educated at The Hall School, Hampstead
English people of Polish-Jewish descent
British Jewish writers
People educated at Westminster School, London
Alumni of Keble College, Oxford
Writers from London
English columnists
Journalists from London
English male journalists
The Times journalists
British restaurant critics
BBC television presenters
English broadcasters
English television personalities
English Jews
Coren family